Bokk Gis Gis is a political party in Senegal, led by Pape Diop. It was principally made up of former members of the Senegalese Democratic Party, led by then-President Abdoulaye Wade, and won 4 seats in the 2012 parliamentary election. In 2017, the party rejoined Wade's coalition, Wattu Senegal, and Pape Diop won the party's lone seat in the 2017 parliamentary election. Following the 2022 parliamentary election Pape Diop was again elected as only MP for the party and he decided to support Macky Sall after its United in Hope coalition fell one seat short of majority to facilitate the formation of a new government.

Electoral history

National Assembly elections

References

Political parties in Senegal
Political parties with year of establishment missing